Age of Uprising: The Legend of Michael Kohlhaas is a 2013 French-German drama film directed by Arnaud des Pallières based on Heinrich von Kleist's novella Michael Kohlhaas, which again is based on the story of Hans Kohlhase. It was nominated for the Palme d'Or at the 2013 Cannes Film Festival.

Plot
During the 16th century, horse dealer Michael Kohlhaas is taking his horses to market. As he passes through a local baron's lands, the baron seizes two of his horses, even though the right to extract tolls has been abolished in the country. When Kohlhaas discovers that his loyal servant was attacked by the baron's guard dogs, and that his horses have been injured and abused, he attempts to sue for monetary compensation, but his lawsuit is dismissed because the baron has a kinsman at court. Then Kohlhaas's wife tries to plead his case to the Princess, but she dies from injuries suffered at the hands of the baron's men.

Kohlhaas leads a revolt to attack the baron's house and then to induce the authorities to administer satisfactory justice. When initially successful, the Princess offers Kohlhaas an amnesty to stop the violence, and he agrees to it, but the deal soon collapses. The baron is sentenced to prison for just two years for his offenses, and Kohlhaas is executed.

Cast

 Mads Mikkelsen as Michael Kohlhaas
 Delphine Chuillot as Judith
 Bruno Ganz as the governor
 Paul Bartel as Jérémie
 Mélusine Mayance as Lisbeth
 David Bennent as César
 David Kross as the preacher
 Denis Lavant as the theologist
 Sergi López as the one-armed man 
 Roxane Duran as Princess Marguerite de Navarre
 Amira Casar as the abbess
 Swann Arlaud as The Baron

Accolades
The film won the Golden Iris at the Brussels Film Festival. In January 2014, the film received six nominations at the 39th César Awards, winning in two categories.

References

External links
 

2013 films
2013 drama films
2010s political drama films
2010s French-language films
Films about rebellions
Films based on works by Heinrich von Kleist
Films set in France
Films set in the 16th century
French political drama films
German political drama films
Films directed by Arnaud des Pallières
French films based on plays
German films based on plays
2010s French films
2010s German films